This is a list of monuments that are classified by the Moroccan ministry of culture around Casablanca.

Monuments and sites in Casablanca 

|}

References 

Casablanca
Casablanca